Donati is a lunar impact crater that is located in the rugged south-central highlands of the Moon. It lies just to the northwest of the crater Faye, and the two outer rims are separated by a gap of less than 10 kilometers. To the north is the comparably sized Airy, and farther to the southeast is Playfair. Donati is 36 kilometers in diameter.

The outer wall of Donati has been eroded by subsequent impacts, particularly in the south and east, where craterlets overlie the rim. The distorted northern rim is joined with the irregularly shaped satellite crater Airy C. The inner floor of Donati is irregular and marked by small craters, particularly in the south and southwest. At the midpoint of the interior is a central rise. The crater is from the Pre-Imbrian period, 4.55 to 3.85 billion years ago.

It is named after the 19th-century Italian astronomer Giovanni Battista Donati.

Satellite craters
By convention these features are identified on lunar maps by placing the letter on the side of the crater midpoint that is closest to Donati.

References

External links

Donati at The Moon Wiki

Impact craters on the Moon